UFC 139: Shogun vs. Henderson was a mixed martial arts event held by the Ultimate Fighting Championship on November 19, 2011 at the HP Pavilion in San Jose, California. It was the first UFC event in San Jose, the longtime home and base arena for Strikeforce.

Background
UFC 139 featured two preliminary fights live on Spike TV.

UFC Heavyweight Champion Cain Velasquez was originally expected to have his first title defense against Junior dos Santos at this event. However, on September 2, 2011, the UFC announced that fight would be moved to the inaugural UFC on Fox event.

To fill-in the vacancy left by Cain vs dos Santos, Dana White confirmed on September 20, 2011 that Dan Henderson had re-signed with the UFC and would fight Maurício "Shogun" Rua for the main event. White also declared that Shogun vs. Henderson would be a "No. 1 contender’s match" for the light heavyweight title. However, White clarified that Rashad Evans was still planned to get the title shot against the winner of Jon Jones vs Rampage Jackson, and that the winner of Shogun vs. Henderson would then get the second crack at the title.

Vitor Belfort was briefly linked to a matchup with Cung Le at this event.  However, Belfort was removed from the bout and replaced by Wanderlei Silva.

Johnny Eduardo was expected to face Michael McDonald at the event.  However, Eduardo was forced from the card with a shoulder injury on November 4 and replaced by promotional newcomer Alex Soto.

It was initially suspected that the first Spike TV preliminary fight would feature Tom Lawlor vs. Chris Weidman, but it became known that it was Michael McDonald fighting UFC newcomer Alex Soto instead.

During the official UFC 139 weigh ins, Shamar Bailey and Nick Pace failed to make the weight limit for their respective weight classes. Bailey came in 3 pounds over, while Pace came in six pounds over. Each fighter was fined 20 percent of their earnings and their bouts took at catchweights of 158 lb and 141 lb respectively.

Results

Critical reception 
The event was well received by critics. The main event drew many accolades, including UFC President Dana White calling it "one of the top three best fights ever in MMA", later comparing the fight to the Thrilla in Manila. The fight would later garner numerous Fight of the Year awards. The fight was later included in the UFC Hall of Fame in 2018.

Bonus awards
Fighters were awarded $70,000 bonuses.

 Fight of the Night: Maurício Rua vs. Dan Henderson and Wanderlei Silva vs. Cung Le
 Knockout of the Night: Michael McDonald
 Submission of the Night: Urijah Faber

Reported payout
The following is the reported payout to the fighters as reported to the California State Athletic Commission. It does not include sponsor money or "locker room" bonuses often given by the UFC and also do not include the UFC's traditional "fight night" bonuses.

Dan Henderson: $250,000 (no win bonus) def. Maurício Rua: $165,000
Wanderlei Silva: $200,000 (no win bonus) def. Cung Le: $350,000
Urijah Faber: $64,000 ($32,000 win bonus) def. Brian Bowles: $19,000
Martin Kampmann: $58,000 ($29,000 win bonus) def. Rick Story: $19,000
Stephan Bonnar: $68,000 ($34,000 win bonus) def. Kyle Kingsbury: $10,000
Ryan Bader: $48,000 ($24,000 win bonus) def. Jason Brilz: $13,000
Michael McDonald: $14,000 ($7,000 win bonus) def. Alex Soto: $6,000
Chris Weidman: $24,000 ($12,000 win bonus) def. Tom Lawlor: $12,000
Gleison Tibau: $54,000 ($27,000 win bonus) def. Rafael dos Anjos: $16,000
Miguel Torres: $60,000 ($30,000 win bonus) def. Nick Pace: $4,000 ^
Seth Baczynski: $16,000 ($8,000 win bonus) def. Matt Brown: $12,000
Danny Castillo: $34,000 ($17,000 win bonus) def. Shamar Bailey: $8,000 ^

^ Shamar Bailey and Nick Pace were reportedly fined 20 percent of their purse for failing to make the required weight for their respective fights. The CSAC's initial report did not include information on the penalty.

References

Ultimate Fighting Championship events
Events in San Jose, California
2011 in mixed martial arts
Mixed martial arts in San Jose, California
Sports competitions in San Jose, California
2011 in sports in California